Mather Brown (baptized October 11, 1761 – May 25, 1831) was an American painter who was born in Boston, Massachusetts and was active in England.

Early life 

Brown was the son of Gawen and Elizabeth (Byles) Brown, and descended from the Rev. Increase Mather on his mother's side. He was taught by his aunt and around 1773 (age 12) became a pupil of Gilbert Stuart. He arrived in London in 1781 to further his training in Benjamin West's studio, entered the Royal Academy schools in 1782 with plans to be a miniature painter, and began to exhibit a year later.

Painting career 

In 1784, he painted two religious paintings for the church of St. Mary’s-in-the-Strand, which led Brown to found a partnership with the painter Daniel Orme for the commercialization of these and other works through exhibition and the sale of engravings. Among these were large paintings of scenes from English history, as well as scenes from Shakespeare's plays. However, despite their success he began to concentrate on portraiture. His first successes were with American sitters, among others his patron John Adams and family in 1784–85; this painting is now in the Boston Athenæum. In the spring of 1786, he began painting the earliest known portrait of Thomas Jefferson, who was visiting London. He also painted Charles Bulfinch the same year. He was elected a Foreign Honorary Member of the American Academy of Arts and Sciences in 1798.

His 1788 full-length portrait of Prince Frederick Augustus in the uniform of Colonel of the Coldstream Guards led to appointment as History and Portrait Painter to the Prince, later the Duke of York and Albany. Other paintings include the Prince of Wales, later George IV (about 1789), Queen Charlotte, and Cornwallis. A self-portrait now belongs to the American Antiquarian Society, Worcester, Massachusetts.

Later life and death 

A falling off of patronage in the mid-1790s, and failure to be elected to the Royal Academy, led Brown to leave London in 1808 for Bath, Bristol, and Liverpool. He settled in Manchester, returning to London almost two decades later, in 1824, where, even after West's death, he continued to imitate his teacher's style of painting. Unable to secure commissions, Brown eventually died in poverty in London.

Gallery

References

Sources
 Evans, Dorinda, Mather Brown: Early American Artist in England. Middletown, CT: Wesleyan, 1982.

External links

 Union List of Artist Names, Getty Vocabularies. ULAN Full Record Display for Mather Brown. Getty Vocabulary Program, Getty Research Institute. Los Angeles, California.

1761 births
1831 deaths
18th-century American painters
18th-century American male artists
American male painters
19th-century American painters
American history painters
American portrait painters
Artists from Boston
Alumni of the Royal Academy Schools
Fellows of the American Academy of Arts and Sciences
18th-century English painters
English male painters
19th-century English painters
English portrait painters
American emigrants to England
American people of English descent
19th-century American male artists
19th-century English male artists
18th-century English male artists